Andreas Haider-Maurer was the defending champion but had to compete at the 2013 US Open instead.

Seeds

Draw

Finals

Top half

Bottom half

References
 Main Draw
 Qualifying Draw

Citta di Como Challenger - Singles
2013 Singles